A list of Yosemite destinations includes hiking trails and things to see:

Hiking trails
Popular hiking trails include:

Near the valley

Yosemite Falls
Bridalveil Falls
Mirror Lake
Mist Trail
Half Dome

Near Glacier Point
Panorama Trail from Glacier Point
Four Mile Trail from Glacier Point
McGurk Meadow
Ostrander Lake
Mono Meadow
Taft Point
Sentinel Dome

Near Wawona
Chilnualna Falls
Alder Creek
Mariposa Grove

Other hiking

Wapama Falls
Rancheria Falls
Soda Springs
Dog Lake
Lembert Dome
Glen Aulin
Elizabeth Lake
Cathedral Lakes
John Muir Trail
Mono Pass
Gaylor Lakes
Lake Vernon trail

Things to see
Popular things to look at in Yosemite Park include:

Waterfalls
See: List of Yosemite waterfalls

Rock formations

Half Dome
El Capitan
Cathedral Rocks
The Three Brothers
Sentinel Rock
Yosemite Point
Glacier Point
Liberty Cap
Kolana Rock
Hetch Hetchy Dome
Clouds Rest

Giant Sequoias
For information about the tree, see Sequoiadendron giganteum. Groves of the trees include:
Mariposa Grove
Tuolumne Grove
Merced Grove

Scenic vistas

Glacier Point
Olmsted Point
Tunnel View
El Portal View
O'Shaughnessy Dam
Cascade View
Pothole Dome
Lembert Dome
Vogelsang Pass
Yosemite Valley itself contains many views

Granite domes

See Granite Domes of Yosemite National Park

References

 Destinations
Yosemite destinations
Yosemite destinations